Dharpa  (aka Dharpa Chuharpur) is a village in Khurja Tehsil in Bulandshahr District of Uttar Pradesh in northern India.  It is situated on the Grand Trunk Road between Bulandshahr and Khurja.  This village is 14 km away from Bulandshahr (South-East) and 5 km away from Khurja (North-West).

The village is one of the 5 Tomar Rajput villages of Tomar (Tanwar) Rajputs.  The other Rajput clans in this village are Jadaun or Jadon, along with one Sisodiya family.  People of various other castes along with few Muslim families, also live in the village.

Schools & education 
There are 3 government schools:
1. Primary School
2. Girls Junior High School
3. Janta Vidyalaya High School - Dharpa Achchheja.
For higher studies after high school, the students need to go to Khurja, where there are 3 main Inter Colleges along with a degree colleague under Chaudhary Charan Singh University (aka Meerut University). Recently village students have also got other options of private or public schools in Khurja and nearby places. It is very unfortunate and sad that there are not many students who are academically doing good in the village. This is because of the deteriorating condition of state government schools.

The important thing is that the villagers put a lot of importance on the education of girls, which is a very good sign for the whole society. It has been noticed in the recent past that sometimes girls' academic performance is better than boys' and a number of girls are pursuing higher education. A fact worth mentioning is that few families have moved to a nearby town just for their daughter's higher education as there is no degree college in the vicinity.

There is One B.A.M.S College has opened in this village, and people come from outside to complete their study, which is very good news about the village and its people. It is about to open a degree college in this village very soon.

There is a Language School is about to open where students of this village and around could take advantage of this.

Postal services 
The village has a post office. The PIN code of this village is 203131.

Police station 
The village comes under Khurja-Dehat (Rural) police station, which is situated just 2 km away toward South-West from a village across GT Road. The good thing is that the village has noticed less crime. The village people live in peace and harmony except for few very small rare cases of crime or violence.

Markets & shops
In the recent past, a number of shops have opened by villagers on the road, which has emerged as a market. No villagers get all the household items from these shops. There are various shops on the road market such as tailor, salons, confectionery, medical stores, grocery and stationery, puncture fixing, cycle/scooter/motorcycle repairing, STD booths, carpenter, flour mill, electronics gadgets repairing, etc. This small market also serves the needs of other nearby villages.

Sources of income 
The main source of income for the majority of people is agriculture. The main crops are sugar-cane, wheat and paddy, and analog with cash crops. The water from the canal is a main source of irrigation. The well known Upper Ganga Canal passes through the village periphery. There are a couple of tube wells as well. In case of shortage of canal's water or electricity, sometimes the farmers are compelled to  use groundwater pumped using diesel engines which becomes a very costly affair.

The village low income population is also dependent on the industries around the village like potteries, dairy and iron rods fabrication factories. The figure of government employees in the village is not very encouraging. There are few village people who have got employment in the private sector.

In the search for employment, the village people migrate to nearby towns and New Delhi.

References

Villages in Bulandshahr district